Ed Veal (born 1 August 1976) is a Canadian racing cyclist. He rode in the men's team pursuit at the 2016 UCI Track Cycling World Championships.

References

External links
 
 

1976 births
Living people
Canadian male cyclists
Place of birth missing (living people)
Canadian track cyclists
Pan American Games medalists in cycling
Pan American Games bronze medalists for Canada
Cyclists at the 2015 Pan American Games
Medalists at the 2015 Pan American Games